Rena MacDonald (April 3, 1907 – November 16, 1958) was an American athlete. She competed in the women's discus throw at the 1928 Summer Olympics.

References

1907 births
1958 deaths
Athletes (track and field) at the 1928 Summer Olympics
American female discus throwers
Olympic track and field athletes of the United States
Sportspeople from the Cape Breton Regional Municipality
Canadian emigrants to the United States
Place of birth missing
20th-century American women